Chance Steven Sanford (born June 2, 1972) is an American former professional baseball player

Drafted by the Pittsburgh Pirates in the 27th round of the 1992 Major League Baseball draft, Sanford made his Major League Baseball (MLB) debut with the Pittsburgh Pirates on April 30, 1998, and appeared in his final MLB game on June 9, 1999.

External links

1972 births
Living people
Albuquerque Dukes players
American expatriate baseball players in Canada
Atlantic City Surf players
Augusta Pirates players
Baseball players from Houston
Calgary Cannons players
Carolina Mudcats players
Gulf Coast Pirates players
Los Angeles Dodgers players
Lynchburg Hillcats players
Major League Baseball second basemen
Major League Baseball shortstops
Major League Baseball third basemen
Nashville Sounds players
Pittsburgh Pirates players
Salem Buccaneers players
San Jacinto Central Ravens baseball players
Welland Pirates players